Gligorov is a Macedonian surname. Notable people with this surname include:

 Filip Gligorov (born 1993), Macedonian football player
 Gligor Gligorov (born 1987), Macedonian football player
 Kiro Gligorov  (1917-2012), Macedonian politician
 Nikola Gligorov (born 1983), Macedonian football player
 Vladimir Gligorov (born 1945), Macedonian politician